Ali Morad Khani-ye Sofla (also Romanized as ‘Alī Morād Khānī-ye Soflá and ‘Alīmorādkhānī-ye Soflá; also known as ‘Alī Morād Khān-e Pā’īn and ‘Alī Morād Khān-e Soflá) is a village in Bijnavand Rural District, in the Zagros District of Chardavol County, Ilam Province, Iran. At the 2006 census, its population was 98, in 19 families. The village is populated by Kurds.

References 

Populated places in Chardavol County
Kurdish settlements in Ilam Province